Space and Time or Time and Space, or variation, may refer to:

 Space and time or time and space or spacetime, any mathematical model that combines space and time into a single interwoven continuum
 Philosophy of space and time

Space and time
 Space and Time (magazine), an American magazine featuring speculative fiction
 Space and Time (Doctor Who), 2011 minisode of Doctor Who
 Space & Time (album), by R.M.C. (Madlib)
 Space & Time (RMC song), 2010 song off the eponymous album Space & Time (album)
 Space & Time (EP), by Celldweller
 Space & Time (Celldweller song), 2012 song off the eponymous EP Space & Time (EP)
 "Space & Time" (song), by Wolf Alice
 "Space and Time", a song by The Verve

Time and space
Time & Space (album) 2018 punk album by Turnstile
 Time + Space (Turnstile song) 2018 song of the eponymous album Time & Space

See also

 
 
 Spacetime (disambiguation)
 Timespace (disambiguation)
 Space (disambiguation)
 Time (disambiguation)
 A Space in Time (album) 1971 album by Ten Years After